Wenallt Camp, also known as Wenallt Enclosure, is an Iron Age enclosure on the southern slope of Wenallt Hill near Rhiwbina in Cardiff, Wales. The site is sometimes classified as a hillfort. The camp is a scheduled monument.

There is an entrance to the south-east, and  there are traces of an external stone revetment. The site would have given views across the Cardiff area and over the Bristol Channel.

The camp lies in an area of semi-natural ancient woodland called The Wenallt, which is a popular site for visitors.

References

Scheduled monuments in Cardiff